King of Spades is the fourth novel in Frederick Manfred's Buckskin Man Tales. Published in 1966, it begins in Iowa before the Civil War and ends in 1876 in Deadwood, S.D.

Novels set in Iowa
Novels set in South Dakota
1966 American novels